The 2004–05 Süper Lig was 47th edition of Turkish league and 4th edition of Turkish Super League. Fenerbahçe won their 16th title, being 3 points ahead Trabzonspor and 4 points ahead Galatasaray. In the final fixture, Diyarbakırspor were 1 point behind Sakaryaspor. Malatyaspor and Diyarbakırspor are rivals, but Malatyaspor, defeating 4-2 Sakaryaspor at home, allowed Diyarbakırspor to remain, winning 1-0 away over Samsunspor. Galatasaray won the Cup, beating rivals Fenerbahçe with 5-1.

Final league table

Results

Statistics

Top scorers

Hat-tricks

References
 Turkish-Soccer.com by Erdinç Sivritepe

Süper Lig seasons
Turkey
1